The 2009 Bromont municipal election took place on November 1, 2009, to elect a mayor and councillors in Bromont, Quebec. Incumbent mayor Pauline Quinlan was re-elected to another term without difficulty.

Results

Source: Simon-Olivier Lorange, Confiance renouvelée en Pauline Quinlan , 2 November 2009, accessed 18 November 2010.

References

2009 Quebec municipal elections